Myall Creek is a locality split between the local government areas of Inverell Shire and the Gwydir Shire in New South Wales, Australia.

It is the location of the 1838 massacre of the local Wirrayaraay people; afterwards, when some of the offenders were brought to trial and hanged, it became the first time white settlers were punished for massacres against Aboriginal people.

History 

By 1837 European settlers had pushed beyond the Peel and Namoi Rivers and taken up large tracts of land along the Gwydir River or the "Big River" as it was then known. Local Gamilaroi groups resisted the alienation of their traditional lands almost immediately. The dispersed nature of the settlers stations enabled the Gamilaroi to easily isolate and attack stockmen and their livestock. In April 1836 two stockmen working for the Hall Brothers, were killed while forming a new station. In September and November of the following year two hutkeepers and two shepherds from the Bowman and Cobb stations were killed. Crown Land Commissioner Alexander Paterson reported back to Sydney in the second half of 1837 that stockmen on the Loder station, which was the westernmost station on the Namoi, were so afraid of raids by the Gamilaroi that they had abandoned their livestock to roam unattended in the bush.

Liverpool Plains settlers demanded military protection against Aboriginal attacks. In response to their demands, Lieutenant-Colonel Kenneth Snodgrass, Acting Governor of New South Wales sent a large Mounted Police party north to enquire into and repress the aggressions complained of. The Mounted Police party, led by Major Nunn and composed of around twenty troopers reached Liverpool Plains in January 1838. What occurred after they arrived remains unclear, but at Waterloo Creek, 50 kilometres southwest of what is now Moree, the Mounted Police encountered a large party of Aboriginal people camped alongside the Creek. In the ensuing melee a number of Aboriginal people were shot in what became known as the Waterloo Creek massacre. The exact number of Aboriginal people killed in the melee is unknown but local squatters who visited site later, reported the number killed to be sixty or seventy. An eyewitness to the encounter testified that forty to fifty may have been killed. Rev Threlkeld in his mission report for 1838 stated that the number may have been as high as two or three hundred.

According to R. H. W. Reece in his book "Aborigines and Colonists," local tradition states that Nunn's party of Mounted Police was involved in at least one more large melee with local Aboriginal people before the party left the Plains. Major Nunn's Campaign (as it was known in the district) did not prevent further racial conflict. In March of that year two men working for Surveyor Finch were killed in the neighbouring district of New England, then in April a hutkeeper on the Gwydir was killed. In the following months stockmen from stations along the Gwydir River organised themselves into armed groups and scoured the country side in what is described by Reece as "a concerted campaign to get rid of all the Aborigines in the district." According to Reece this still known in local tradition as "The Bushwhack" or "The Drive". The Myall Creek Massacre took place in June of that year, on Myall Creek Station near the Gwydir River.

The twelve men responsible for the massacre included freed convicts and assigned convicts, led by John Fleming, the manager of the Mungie Bundie Station. The original party assembled at Bengari on a station owned by Archibald Bell before they set off and were joined by the remaining members somewhere along the Gwydir River. After spending the day unsuccessfully pursuing Aborigines the group came to the Myall Creek Station. They discovered approximately 30 Aborigines belonging to the Gamilaroi and Wirrayaraay peoples on the station, rounded them up and tied them together. When the station hand, George Anderson asked what they intended to do with the Aborigines he was told they were taking them over the back of the range to frighten them. A few minutes later the Gamilaroi and Wirrayaraay were led off and massacred. Two days later the men returned to burn the bodies. The impact of the massacre on the Gamilaroi and Wirrayaraay peoples was devastating. As one of the descendants whose great-great-great-grandfather survived the massacre states 'We didn't want to talk about it because of how dreadful it was I remember when we used to drive past that place. It just had a feeling about it that I can't explain'.

The Myall Creek massacre was marked by the unusual circumstance that one of the station hands who did not participate in the massacre, George Anderson, informed the station manager, William Hobbs, who reported the incident to the local magistrate. The reports by Anderson and Hobbs were not without danger, as the inquiry of magistrate Edward Day noted "[I] took George Anderson with [me], believing that [his] life would be in danger if he remained at Myall Creek".

In response to the charging of the eleven suspects settlers formed groups such as the "Black Association" to support the men charged with the murder. Papers such as the Sydney Herald protested against the trials. Charging the perpetrators of the massacre also stimulated the activism of religious and humanitarian groups who called for the execution of the perpetrators. These views were promoted through papers such as the Sydney Monitor and the Australian.

Upon being found not guilty, seven of the men were re-arrested and tried for the murder of an Aboriginal male named Charley. The second trial resulted in a guilty verdict and all seven men were sentenced to death. Governor George Gipps later wrote that none of the seven attempted to deny their crime, though all stated they thought it extremely hard that white men should be put to death for killing blacks. On 18 December 1838, after all legal objections were exhausted and the Executive Council rejected petitions for clemency, the sentences were carried out.

Heritage listings 
Myall Creek has a number of heritage-listed sites, including:
 Bingara Delungra Road: Myall Creek Massacre and Memorial Site

References

Bibliography 

 Historical Records of Australia.
 
 
 
 .

Attribution 
 and Myall Creek Massacre and Memorial Site, Bingara Delungra Rd, Myall Creek via Bingara, NSW, Australia published by the Government of Australia and the Department of Environment and Energy under CC-BY 3.0 license, accessed on 16 July 2018.

External links

Inverell Shire
Gwydir Shire
Articles incorporating text from the New South Wales State Heritage Register